1967 Campeonato Brasileiro Série A may stand for:

 1967 Campeonato Brasileiro Série A (Taça Brasil)
 1967 Campeonato Brasileiro Série A (Torneio Roberto Gomes Pedrosa)